Valparaíso earthquake

 1730 Valparaíso earthquake
 1822 Valparaíso earthquake
 1906 Valparaíso earthquake
 1965 Valparaíso earthquake and the El Cobre dam failures